NH 112 may refer to:

 National Highway 112 (India)
 New Hampshire Route 112, United States